Interleukin enhancer-binding factor 2 is a protein that in humans is encoded by the ILF2 gene.

Function 

Nuclear factor of activated T-cells (NFAT) is a transcription factor required for T-cell expression of the interleukin 2 gene. NFAT binds to a sequence in the interleukin 2 gene enhancer known as the antigen receptor response element 2. In addition, NFAT can bind RNA and is an essential component for encapsidation and protein priming of hepatitis B viral polymerase. NFAT is a heterodimer of 45 kDa and 90 kDa proteins, the smaller of which is the product of this gene. The encoded protein binds strongly to the 90 kDa protein and stimulates its ability to enhance gene expression.

Interactions 

ILF2 has been shown to interact with CDC5L and DNA-PKcs.

ILF2 and ILF3 have been identified as autoantigens in mice with induced lupus, in canine systemic rheumatic  autoimmune disease, and as a rare finding in humans with autoimmune disease.

References

Further reading

External links 
 
 PDBe-KB provides an overview of all the structure information available in the PDB for Mouse Interleukin enhancer-binding factor 2 (ILF2) 

Transcription factors